The Book of the Righteous of the Eastern Borderlands, edition  of Institute of National Remembrance (Poland), gathering testimonies of humanity of Ukrainians during the  Ukrainian-Polish ethnic conflict and Massacres of Poles in Volhynia, covering the period of 1939–1945 yr.

The book refers to 882 cases of aid provided by 1341 persons allowing for 2527 lives to be saved. The identities of 896 rescuers have been established. Also are included reports of 384 cases of rescuers who were murdered in punitive aftermath.

External links
 Niedzielko Romuald, THE BOOK OF THE RIGHTEOUS OF THE EASTERN BORDERLANDS 1939 - 1945 (pdf), Instytut Pamięci Narodowej  

Massacres of Poles in Volhynia
Institute of National Remembrance
History books about Poland
History books about Ukraine